Muthumani Somasundaran is an Indian actress who mainly works in Malayalam films. She made her cinematic debut through the Malayalam film Rasathanthram directed by Sathyan Anthikkad's  in 2006.

Early life and education

Muthumani was born in Ernakulam, Kerala to Somasundaran and Shirly Somasundaran. They were active in the theatre field, which influenced her to enter into the theatre plays. She went to St. Mary's Convent Girls High School, Ernakulam. She has worked as a child artist for All India Radio. She learned dance but later moved onto mono-act. She topped the mono-act competitions in the Kerala School Kalolsavam for nine consecutive years. She obtained her graduate degree in Law from The National University of Advanced Legal Studies (N.U.A.L.S), Kochi.

Career

Theatre

Muthumani joined and actively participated in the Amateur Theatre Wing. She played the central character, Vasundhara in Oru Dalit Yuvathiyude Kadana Katha, based on M. Mukundan's novelette. She was closely associated with the theatre groups in Kochi from her school days. It was while doing her Plus Two education that she travelled to Greece for the Ancient Greek Theatre Festival to represent India under the banner ‘Lokadharmi’ which were the only team from the Asia- Pacific region. The play was based on the Greek character Medea in which she played a 35-year-old mother of two. She won the best actress for the play Mukkanji at the Theatre Olympiad held in Orissa. She donned the role of Chethu, a masculine woman in the play. That honour eventually got her the role in Sathyan Anthikkad's Malayalam film, Rasathanthram. She also did a play called Lanka Lakshmi in which she played the Mandodari.

She acted in a Malayalam adaptation of The God of Small Things, where she acted as Rahel and as Arundhati Roy. She also played the role of Kannagi in Madurai Kandam, the last segment of Silappatikaram.

Film

Muthumani made her film debut in Sathyan Anthikkad's, Rasathanthram opposite Mohanlal, in which she played the character who has a crush on the character played by Mohanlal. After that she has acted several notable Malayalam films. Some of her notable roles were in Kadal Kadannu Oru Maathukutty, How Old Are You?, Oru Indian Pranayakadha, Njaan and Lukka Chuppi.

Personal life
Muthumani completed her Bachelor's in Law from National University of Advanced Legal Studies. After completing law, she enrolled as an advocate in Kerala High Court, Ernakulam. She is now focusing on, Prerana, a life-skill training centre, which "gives need-based training for students, teachers and corporates." She is married to screenwriter/director Arun P. R., who director the 2019 Malayalam Movie Finals.

Filmography

Television career
Njnannu Sthree (Amrita TV) as Anchor
Kuttikalavara (Flowers TV) as anchor
Chandralekha (Reporter TV) as anchor
Ithalukal (Asianet News) as Anchor
Chakkarapanthal (Mathrubhumi News) as Anchor

Dubbing credit
 for  Padmapriya -  Iyobinte Pusthakam (2014)

References

Living people
21st-century Indian women lawyers
21st-century Indian actresses
Actresses from Kochi
Indian film actresses
Actresses in Malayalam cinema
Indian stage actresses
Actresses in Malayalam theatre
Actresses in Malayalam television
Indian television actresses
21st-century Indian lawyers
Year of birth missing (living people)